Microtropis keningauensis is a species of plant in the family Celastraceae. It is endemic to Borneo where it is confined to Sabah.

References

keningauensis
Endemic flora of Borneo
Flora of Sabah
Vulnerable plants
Taxonomy articles created by Polbot